The Papua New Guinea national Australian rules football team (nicknamed the Mosquitos and for sponsorship purposes, the Telikom PNG Mosquitos) represents Papua New Guinea in the team sport of Australian rules football. It is one of the nation's most successful sporting teams, currently ranked 2nd in the world behind Australia. 

The PNG Mosquitos are selected from the best born and bred male players from the clubs and teams of Papua New Guinea. Formed in the 1960s to participate in tests against popular teams from Australia, PNG debuted internationally in 1976 against Nauru in front of a crowd of over 10,000 at Sir Hubert Murray Stadium in Port Moresby which it won convincingly. It has a strong rivalry with Indigenous Australian teams, defeating them in the majority of their rare encounters including 1973, 1974 and 2009. It has remained a dominant international side, becoming the most decorated nation in international Australian Football, having won the most Australian Football International Cup titles (3 - 2008, 2014, 2017) and five medals including 3 silver medals (2002, 2005, 2011), featuring in every Grand Final since the inaugural tournament in 2002, as well as winning three gold medals at the Arafura Games.

Identity
The team's nickname is the Mosquitos or "Mozzies" (aka Binatangs – local PNG name for small insects, similar to a mosquito). The moniker was formally adopted in 1993.

The Mosquito's guernsey has the kumul (raggiana bird-of-paradise), a national symbol of PNG (and element of the national flag of Papua New Guinea), in the national colours of red, black and yellow.

Prior to each match, the Mosquitos perform the 'Ole Ole' war dance.

History

Prior to the independence of Papua New Guinea, various representative sides were assembled. The earliest, in 1956 representing Papua travelled to Australia and defeated regional representative Queensland sides from both Cairns and Innisfail.

In the late 60s and early 1970s, Australian clubs began to notice the rapid growth of the game in PNG and toured to compete against selections of local players but it wasn't until 1973 that the national team first began to form, mainly to tour Australia to play against indigenous sides.

As part of the celebrations for independence in 1975 the first full international test played between the national sides of Papua New Guinea and Nauru in front of a crowd of over 10,000 at Sir Hubert Murray Stadium in Port Moresby was won by PNG by 129 points. Despite significant planning reciprocal tour to Nauru planned for 1978 did not eventuate. One of the biggest challenges for the national team was that many of its best players were outside of Port Moresby (some of the strongest leagues were in the north, the highlands and New Britain) and lacked a means to travel to train and play in the team, let alone to fly overseas.

1977 saw Australian Under 17 squad tour Papua New Guinea, and the PNG team reciprocated in Adelaide, with Australia taking the honours in a close match.

In 1978 Australia's National Football League assumed control of the team and diverted all its funding to juniors and entered a side into the 1979 Teal Cup to create a talent pathway to VFL however the initiative was extremely unsuccessful with the Teal Cup team performing disastrously and no players recruited to the senior VFL. Due to no funding for senior international tests (PNG had to cancel its proposed 1979 tour of Nauru), it also caused the PNG government to withdraw all national funding for the sport. Following the withdrawal of the Australian administration and the collapse of the national competitions, an undermanned PNG team played mainly against teams mainly from Queensland.

In 1995 the Mosquitos competed internationally under the moniker of the Mosquitos at the Arafura Games in Darwin, Northern Territory.  That year PNG won the gold medal of the International division defeating New Zealand.  In the same competition, PNG also competed against sides from Nauru, Japan, Singapore and Hong Kong.

In 1996 the Mosquitoes played a curtain raiser to an Australian Football League match in Perth overwhelmingly defeating the Central Desert Eagles.

In 1997, PNG successfully defended their Arafura Games title again defeating New Zealand.

In 1999 won the gold medal again at the games, once again defeating New Zealand in the final.

In 2000, the Mosquitoes were invited to play New Zealand in a curtain raiser to a pre-season AFL match in Wellington, but were unable to raise the funds required.

In 2002, Papua New Guinea competed in the International Cup in Melbourne.  PNG went through the competition undefeated only to lose to Ireland in the Grand Final.

A minor setback to the representation of the Mosquitos was the cancellation of the 2003 Arafura Games due to SARS fears.

Prior to the 2005 International Cup, AFL legend Mal Michael offered to play for the PNG side, but was ruled ineligible by the AFL.  Although he was born in PNG, he did not satisfy the criteria since he had moved to Australia at too young an age.  Despite Michael not being involved in the side, he tipped PNG to win the competition, hailing the strong growth in the local competitions.

In the 2005 International Cup, PNG again went through the competition unbeaten only to lose the Grand Final to a much improved New Zealand national team.  Papua New Guinea's best and fairest player (from the 2005 International Cup) is Navu Maha.  Navu also won the award for the best player in the 2005 International Cup series and captained both the 2002 and 2005 teams.

In early 2008, the national team secured its first major sponsor – Telikom PNG – which helped to fund the junior squads competing in Australia and the senior squad's International Cup campaign.

In the 2008 International Cup, PNG, captained by Alister Sioni again went through the competition unbeaten, this time defeating New Zealand in a thriller.  2 points up at the final siren, 17-year-old Amua Pirika kicked a goal after the siren.  Donald Barry was best on the ground in the Grand Final.  Overa Gibson was best and fairest in the 2008 International Cup.  4 Mosquitos were named in the All-International team – Donald Barry, Overa Gibson, Joe Lla and Stanis Susuve.

A spin-off team, the PNG Maruks club, formed in 2019 to play under different eligibility criteria, won the Asian Australian Football Championships in 2019 in their debut year.

International competition

International Cup
2002: 2nd
2005: 2nd
2008: 1st
2011: 2nd
2014: 1st
2017: 1st

Arafura Games
1995: 1st
1997: 1st
1999: 1st
2001: Did not compete

Squad and Test history

1969 squad 
This squad was formed to compete against the VFL's visiting St Kilda Football Club which had finished 7/12 (outside finals) in the VFL.

Strong; Leitch; Bae; Pak; Mackinlay; Wiimot; Amini; Roge Iga; Sinari; Wastell; James; Vele; Peni; Ravu Ope; Pickering; Wapa; Bennett; Waea; Dobson; Bernard Mou; Radcliffe

1973/4 squad 
This squad defeated Indigenous Australia twice, once at Ainslie Oval in Canberra.

Joe Bubuo; Karo Vala; Vali Leka; Joe Pagleo; Bernard Mou; Michael Bai; Phillip George; Agarobe Tau; Boga Tali

1975 (First National) squad
Squad formed to tour Tasmania for an annual match against Aboriginal Australia but was cancelled due to no funding from Australia.

Veari Maha; S. Mairi; A. Leka; R. Ila; G. Guma; I. Ila; B. Leka; R. Leka (Koboni); B. Tali (Aviat); R. Iga; H. Tokapage; M. Tulungum (Port Moresby); E. Ragi (University); G. Nongkas (Elcom); M. Bai; R. Maisu (Defence Force);
P. Waea; A. Tau; B. Kaiae; R. Aup; K. Vala (Lae); L. Au; H. Ofora (Bougainville); P. Amini (Madang); P. Aumi (Rabaul)

1976 squad
This side was formed for the first true international against Nauru and to take on 1975 VFL premiers and 1976 VFL Grand Finalists North Melbourne.

Veari Maha; Ian MacKinlay; Steven Kakot; Tiana Ila; Martin Tullungun; Gimana Gurna; Ereman Ragi; Vili Maha; Henry Aisapo; Phillip George; Raymond Maisu; Mea Vui; Michael Bai; Gerea Aopi; Mau Au; Pat Amini (Port Moresby); Peiwa Waea; Karo Vala; Barnabas Kaiei; Chris Bais (Lae); Peter Amini (Rabaul)

1977 squad
P. Aumi; W. Gare; D. Haro; P. Pati; W. Maha (Port Moresby); R. Aup; P.Waea; C. Bais; Eomelus, K. Vala; C. Daun, (Lae), Y. Maha; B. Haile; G. Laka; A. Colombus; (Goroka); S. Lowa; B. Malagau; S. Akis; M. Tullungan (Rabaul); G. Vegogo; (Madang); B. Matuy; (Wewak);

1978 squad
J. Matage (capt); K. Akiro; P. Aumi; A. Ben; D. Haro; J. Kali; M. Tulungan (Moresby); C. Bais; R. Karo; V. Maha; I. Mari; R. Roga; K. Vala (Lae); P. Pati (v-capt); J. Dau; M. Henry; L. Woiwoi (Rabaul); A. Columbus;
M. Dono; M. Haro; P. Karo (Goroka); R. Bob; P. Shapen; T. Waluka (Hagen); A. Sodas (Madang)

1979 (Teal Cup U17) squad
lamo Alearu (Boroko); George Ambo (Saints United); Repa Au (Kwikila); Isidore Buetwel (Mongop); Berto Dedei (Kimbe) Katinga Demas (Utu); Robert Edward (Normil); Gamoga Gini (Rigo-ANG); Kana Ila (Koboni); Olo Ila (Koboni Kangas); Roy Kenba (Branch); Heni Kila (Mokele); Pius Kopang (Vunakanau); Kamas Kuian (Sogeri); Mathew Lekani (Hoskins); Tommy Manu (Goroka); Francis Mondo (Vunakanau); Leloi Odana (Tusbab); Vele Rupa (Tusbab); Harison Sale (Namatanai); Ila Tiana (Koboni); Graham Tovili (West United); Tuli Tuli (Boroko); Gerea Vagi (Mokele)

1980 squad
Anis Tobata; Steven Kotak; Vali Mavara (Rabaul); Rex Kaupa; Andrew Columbus (Goroka); Peiwa Waea; Kassy Akiro (Lae); Joel Matage; James Logha; Andrew Posai; Gerard Lamis; Vali Leka; William Maha; Daniel Kosikien; Nathan Kaumu; Mau Auk; John Wesley; Paul Sipori; Clement Nakmai; Kila Vuivagi; Peter Aumi (National Capital); Robert Kua; Ando Kwalom; Malcolm Bai

2002 (International Cup) squad
1. Walter Yangomina; 2. John Ropa; 3. Peter Meli; 4. Vagi Lai; 5. John Bosko; 6. Jackson Gavuri; 7. Stephen Keu; 9. Andrew Boko; 10. Abraham Henao; 11. Rex Leka; 13. Matthew Mondo; 14. Navu Maha; 15. David Gavara; 16. Bruce Sovara; 17. Pele Kila; 18. Nathan Lowa; 19. Douglas Lai; 21. Bruce Tandawai; 22. Overa Gibson; 25. Hendry Pare; 26. Matthew Bae; 28. Patrick Vuluka; 29. Richard Aupae; 30. Joachim Loggha

2005 (International Cup) squad
Coach: Trevor Ila
Anaga Isaac (Morobe Province); Desmond Kaumu (West New Britain); Sylvester Magaea (West New Britain); Dominic Livuana (Daru, Western Province); Glen Tom (West New Britain); Joseph Ila (Kimbe); Rex Leka (C) (West New Britain); Robert Lamboku (Kimbe); Brendon Lulubo (	Hoskins); Walter Yangomina (Enga); David Evertius (Milne Bay Province); Morris Aka (West New Britain); Rickard Peni (East New Britain); Chris Lagisa (Talasea); Matthew Mondo (Talasea); Mesea Dorogori (East New Britain); Peter Meli (VC) (Central); Matthew Bae (Central); Overa Gibson (Gulf); Alister Sioni (West New Britain); Michael Ben (Kimbe); Francis Navus (Talasea); Emmanuel Bai (West New Britain); Mark Gori (Kimbe); David Gavara Nanu (New Ireland); Junior Henry (Central); Navu Maha (Central); Kila Pepe (Central); Steven Keu (Kimbe); Stanley Tapend (Enga); Paul Philip (Chimbu); Aria Junior (Gulf); Connie Papau (New Ireland); Raga Raga	(Central); Milaura Peter (Gulf)

2008 (International Cup) squad (premiers)

Rex Leka (Central) (captain); Joe Ila (Central); John James	(Gulf); Willy Aisi (Central); Desmond Nalong (Morobe); Augustine Bede (West New Britain); Elija Barowai	(Western Highlands); Sylvester Mangoea	(West New Britain); Boas Keu	(West New Britain); Alois Baleko (West New Britain); David Evertius	(Central); Emmaus Wartovo (East New Britain); Zachary Rava (West New Britain); Peter Milaure (Gulf); Desmond Waluka	(West New Britain); Jimmy Logha	(West New Britain); Stanis Susuve (Gulf); Amua Pirika (Morobe); Alan Kaumu	(West New Britain); Mesa Dorogori (Western Province); Johnny Bosko (West New Britain); Overa Gibson (Gulf); Donald Barry (Gulf);  Alestar Sioni (West New Britain); Henry Henry	(East New Britain); John Vincent (Gulf); Bruce Savara (West New Britain); Raga Raga(Central); Niki Appamumu (West New Britain); Ali Pinda (Chimbu); Emergencies: Peter Labi (Eastern Islands); Emmanual Tupia (West New Britain); Johnny Vogoe (West New Britain); David Meli (West New Britain)

2011 (International Cup) squad
Theo Gavuri	(West New Britain); Gideon Simon (Western Highlands); David Meli (Central); Wingti Pena	(Western Highlands); Joe Ila (Central); Jim Logha (West New Britain); Brendon Beno (Bougainville); Fredrick Peni (East New Britain); John James (Gulf); Paul Philip (Chimbu);	Larry Nao (Gulf); Lawrie Logo (East New Britain); Alestair Sione (Morobe); Peter Milaura (Gulf); Richard Stegman (Western Highlands); Greg Aki (Western Highlands); Henry Henry (East New Britain); John Vogae (West New Britain; Collins Slim (Gulf); Emmaus Wartovo (East New Britain; Peter Labi (Morobe); Major Alphonse	(West New Britain); Stanis Susuve (Gulf); Ali Pinda	(Chimbu); Amua Pirika (Central); Emmanuel Tupia	(West New Britain); Jeffrey Nemete (West New Britain); Bruce Sovare	(West New Britain); Nicholas Apamumu (Kimbe); John Ikupu (East New Britain); Tiernan Carbry	(Central); Willy Aisi (Central); Gagu Kayage (Western Province); Alois Melua (West new Britain);

2014 (International Cup) squad (premiers)
Peter Labi (North Cairns); Ryan Agita (Broadbeach); Stanis Susuve (Coolangatta); Amua Pirika (Campbelltown); Emmaus Wartovo (Port Moresby Dockers); Gideon Simon (Richmond); John James (Aspley); Jason So'ong (Coolamon); Jeconiah Peni (Campbelltown); Emmanuel Tupia (Port Moresby Dockers); Greg Aki (Coolamon); John Ikupu (West Coburg); Peter Milaura (Gulf Giants); Stanis Agita (Broadbeach); Donald Barry (Coolangatta); Paul Phillip (Gordons Kokofas); Theo Gavuri (Sydney Hills Eagles); Jeffrey Namete (Taurama Suns); Sylvester Mangaea (Port Moresby Dockers); Brendan Beno (Coolangatta); Willie Asi (North Cairns); Michael Macca (Carnington/Linton); Scott Johnson (Carnington/Linton); Chris Mong (Taurama Suns); Wingti Pena (University Tigers); David Topeni (University Tigers); Alphonse Jambafuro (Campbelltown); Laurie Logo (University Tigers); Clydie Pulah (University Tigers); Elliot Takolu (Lae); Freddie Kalandi (Mt Hagen); Tony Meli (Lae); Freeman Keno (Lae); Greg Ekari (Bomana Cats); Kataha Siwee (Bomana Cats); Luke Savere (Bomana Cats); Brendan Gotuno (University Tigers); Ezra Gotuno (Gerehu Magpies); Ori Nilmo (Port Moresby Dockers); David Stegman (Mt. Hagen)
Richard Stegman (Mt. Hagen); Sunny Yogomin (Gordons Kokofas); Sam Ila (Gordons Kokofas); David Meli (Port Moresby Dockers)

2017 (International Cup) squad (premiers)
John James Lavai (Koboni) (captain); Hewago Paul Oea (Gordon Kokofas); Hapeo Bobogi (Gordon Kokofas);  Kelly Kaugla (Bomana Cats); Benedict Tirang (West Eagles); Scott Johnson (Salle Dogs); Tyler Goroga (Pt Hedland Tigers); Luke Savere	(Defence Hawks); Jeconiah Peni (Montrose); Amua Pirika	(Central Bombers); Ryan Agita (Hermit Park Tigers); Emmaus Wartovo (Sandgate Hawks); Matthew King (Montrose); Jason So-ong (Mt Hagen); Brendan Beno (Koboni); Gideon Simon (Trinity Bulldogs); Max Lavai (Koboni); Stannis Agita (Hermit Park Tigers); Jeffrey Namete (Taurama Suns); David Topeni (Koboni); Gregory Ekari (West Eagles); Laurie Logo (Lamana Dockers); Kataha Paulias Siwee	(Bomana Cats); Paul Phillip (Koboni); Willie Aisi (Manunda Hawks); John Ikupu (West Coburg); Douglas Gabriel Tuai Lai (Koboni); Alphonse Jambarufo (Koboni); Emmanuel Tupia (Lamana Dockers); Greg Paul Aki (Koboni)

Junior Men's Team
The "Binatangs" represent PNG at Under 14, U16 and U18 levels.

The Binatangs compete in the Queensland Country Australian Football Championships and more recently, the Queensland State Australian Football Championships.

Women's Teams
A women's national team began representing Papua New Guinea at the 2017 AFL International Cup.

Women's national teams:
 Flame - Senior/Open
 Kapundas - Under 18/19 
 Karakums- Under 16/17

See also
Australian rules football in Papua New Guinea
AFL PNG

References

External links
Video of PNG National Team performing 'Ole Ole' war dance at 2005 International Cup

National Australian rules football teams
Australian rules football in Papua New Guinea
A